Events in 1952 in animation.

Events

January
 January 1: Norm McLaren releases Voisins (Neighbours).

February
 February 5: Chuck Jones' Feed the Kitty premieres, produced by Warner Bros. Cartoons.
 February 8: Jack Hannah's Lambert the Sheepish Lion, produced by the Walt Disney Company, is first released.
 February 9: Tex Avery's Magical Maestro premieres, produced by MGM and starring Spike.

March
 March 15: Hanna-Barbera's Tom & Jerry cartoon The Two Mouseketeers is first released, produced by MGM. This is the first of several shorts in which the characters appear as musketeers.
 March 20: 24th Academy Awards: The Two Mouseketeers wins the Academy Award for Best Animated Short.

September
 September 20: Chuck Jones' Rabbit Seasoning is first released, produced by Warner Bros. Cartoons, starring Bugs Bunny, Daffy Duck and Elmer Fudd.

October
 October 10: Jack Hannah's Donald Duck cartoon Trick or Treat premieres, produced by the Walt Disney Company. It features the debut of Witch Hazel who would become a recurring character in Disney comics.
 October 31: Jack Kinney's Goofy cartoon Two Weeks Vacation, produced by the Walt Disney Company, premieres.

November
 November 15: Bob McKimson's Bugs Bunny short Rabbit's Kin premieres, produced by Warner Bros. Cartoons which marks the debut of Pete Puma.

Specific date unknown
 Lev Atamanov's film The Scarlet Flower is first released.
 Ivan Ivanov-Vano and Aleksandra Snezhko-Blotskaya's The Snow Maiden is first released.
 Colin Low's The Romance of Transportation in Canada is first released.
 Norman McLaren's Neighbours premieres.

Films released

 September - The Shepherdess and the Chimney Sweep (France)
 December 22 - The Visions of Tay-Pi (Spain)
 December 31:
 The Scarlet Flower (Soviet Union)
 The Snow Maiden (Soviet Union)

Television series

Births

January
 January 19: Beau Weaver, American voice actor (voice of Superman in Superman, Mr. Fantastic in Fantastic Four).
 January 20: Dave Fennoy, American actor (voice of Dick Scott in New Kids on the Block, Tetrax in the Ben 10 franchise, Pong Krell in Star Wars: The Clone Wars, Pietro Polendina in RWBY).
 January 28: Bruce Helford, American television writer and producer (The Oblongs).
 January 30: Steve Bartek, American guitarist, composer (Family Dog, Cabin Boy, Nightmare Ned, An Extremely Goofy Movie), orchestrator (The Nightmare Before Christmas, The Tigger Movie, Mickey, Donald, Goofy: The Three Musketeers, Meet the Robinsons, The Simpsons Movie, Bee Movie, Frankenweenie, Epic, Mr. Peabody & Sherman, The Grinch) and music producer (Harvey Beaks).

February
 February 2: Ryuji Mizuno, Japanese voice actor (voice of Giichi in Naruto, Meme Midgard in Turn A Gundam, B'T Radio in B't X, Master in  Zombie Land Saga Revenge, Julius in Berserk), (d. 2022).
 February 5: Yoshinori Kanada, Japanese animator (Birth, worked for Hayao Miyazaki), (d. 2009).
 February 17: Garry Chalk, English-born Canadian actor (voice of Optimus Primal in Beast Wars: Transformers, Optimus Prime in the Unicron trilogy, Slash, Herr Doktor, and Turbo in ReBoot, Grounder in Adventures of Sonic the Hedgehog, Dr. Robotnik in Sonic Underground, Dr. Light in Mega Man: Fully Charged, King Hippo and Donkey Kong in Captain N: The Game Master, Hercules in Class of the Titans, Mungus in Dragon Tales, Prince Rutherford in My Little Pony: Friendship is Magic).
 February 18: Salene Weatherwax, American animator (Heidi's Song, Garfield's Feline Fantasies, Tom and Jerry: The Movie), character designer (Hanna-Barbera, The Critic, Animaniacs) and prop designer (Garfield and Friends, Freakazoid!, The Angry Beavers, Family Guy).
 February 23: Brad Whitford, American musician and member of Aerosmith (voiced himself in The Simpsons episode "Flaming Moe's").
 Specific date unknown: Marcelo Tubert, Argentine actor (voice of Mr. Alvarez in Handy Manny, Marty Mendez in King of the Hill, Doc in Hellsing, Hector Papdopolis in the Pinky and the Brain episode "Dangerous Brains", additional voices in The Book of Life and Over the Hedge).

March
 March 2: 
 Laraine Newman, American actress, writer and comedian (voice of Connie in The Coneheads, Lois Foutley in As Told by Ginger, Queen Jipjorrulac in The Fairly OddParents, Miss Information in Histeria!, Ella Plankton in SpongeBob SquarePants, Ms. Hubbard in The Oblongs, Queen Ligea in Winx Club, the Wicked Witch of the West in Tom and Jerry and the Wizard of Oz and Dorothy and the Wizard of Oz, Gran in Dawn of the Croods, Peaches in Ridley Jones, Baby Doll in The New Batman Adventures episode "Love is a Croc", Toby Raynes in the Superman: The Animated Series episode "Apokolips... Now!", Lily in the Avatar: The Last Airbender episode "The Cave of Two Lovers").
 Mark Evanier, American television writer (Garfield and Friends).
 March 19: Harvey Weinstein, American convicted sex offender and former film producer (Princess Mononoke, Clerks: The Animated Series, Tokyo Pig, Unstable Fables, The Nutty Professor, Hoodwinked Too! Hood vs. Evil, Escape from Planet Earth, Underdogs, Paddington, voiced himself in My Scene Goes Hollywood: The Movie).

April
 April 5: Mitch Pileggi, American actor (voice of James Gordon in The Batman, Dr. Stanton in the Batman Beyond episode "Payback").
 April 12: Francis Glebas, American keynote speaker, writer, film director, storyboard artist, and teacher (Walt Disney Animation Studios).
 April 15:
 Glenn Shadix, American actor (voice of the Mayor of Halloween Town in The Nightmare Before Christmas, Brain and Monsieur Mallah in Teen Titans), (d. 2010).
 Sam McMurray, American actor (voice of Robby Fisher and Buckley Lloyd in Hey Arnold!, various characters in The Boondocks, Postmaster General in Klaus, Pierce in the Batman: The Animated Series episode "Birds of a Feather", Cyrus Tompkins in The Critic episode "Sherman, Woman and Child", Mickey and Fred in the Aaahh!!! Real Monsters episode "Krumm Gets Ahead", Ernie in The New Batman Adventures episode "Joker's Millions", Rodrick Snootwell in The Angry Beavers episode "Dumbwaiters", Zookeeper in the Rugrats episode "Zoo Story", Flip in The Wild Thornberrys episode "You Otter Know", Larry Lux in The Zeta Project episode "Ro's Reunion", Mr. Gripling in the As Told by Ginger episode "Tgif", Gilbert Halestrom and Jerry in the Justice League Unlimited episode "Fearful Symmetry", Tucker Wade in the Glenn Martin, DDS episode "From Here to Fraternity", additional voices in Bonkers and Lloyd in Space).
 April 16: Billy West, American voice actor (voice of Ren Höek and Stimpy in The Ren & Stimpy Show, the title character and Roger Klotz in Doug, Philip J. Fry, Professor Farnsworth, Zoidberg, Zapp Brannigan, and other various characters in Futurama, Red M&M in M&M ads, Bugs Bunny in Space Jam, Shaggy Rogers in Scooby-Doo on Zombie Island, Popeye in Popeye's Voyage: The Quest for Pappy, Bashful in The 7D).
 April 17: Joe Alaskey, American voice actor (voice of Grandpa Lou in Rugrats and Uncle Stinkie in Casper, continued voice of Bugs Bunny, Daffy Duck, and Droopy) (d. 2016).
 April 20: Mark Schiff, American actor and comedian (voice of Little Dog in 2 Stupid Dogs, Boy Beaver in the Timon & Pumbaa episode "Amusement Bark", himself in the Dr. Katz, Professional Therapist episode "Mask").
 April 27: Hilary Bader, American television writer (Warner Bros. Animation), (d. 2002).
 April 29: Nora Dunn, American actress and comedian (voice of Lydia Karaoke, Statue of Liberty and Barbara S. in Histeria!, Frieda in The Wild Thornberrys, Coach Candace and Philbert in As Told by Ginger, Gigi in The Boss Baby: Back in Business, Precious in the Pinky and the Brain episode "Brainwashed: Part 3 - Wash Hard", Morgan Proctor in the Futurama episode "How Hermes Requisitioned His Groove Back").

May
 May 6: Fred Newman, American actor (voice of Porkchop, Skeeter Valentine, and Mr. Dink in Doug, Stupid in Who Framed Roger Rabbit).
 May 8: Kent Holaday, American animator (Walt Disney Animation Studios, Maxie's World, BraveStarr, Who Framed Roger Rabbit, The New Adventures of Beany and Cecil, Mighty Mouse: The New Adventures) and lip sync artist (DIC Entertainment, The Simpsons, The New Adventures of He-Man, Captain Planet and the Planeteers, The Ren & Stimpy Show, Rocko's Modern Life, Klasky Csupo, The Critic, The Maxx, King of the Hill, Daria, Celebrity Deathmatch, Futurama, Sheep in the Big City, Baby Blues), (d. 2001).
 May 11: Shohreh Aghdashloo, Iranian-American actress (voice of Mehrnaz in Window Horses, Queen Janna in The Lion Guard, Enforcer Grayson in Arcane, Hat Salesperson in the Curious George episode "The Clean, Perfect Yellow Hat", Mina in The Simpsons episode "MyPods and Boomsticks", additional voices in the Archer episode "The Big Con").
 May 21: Mr. T, American actor and professional wrestler (voice of Mr. T-Rex in The Terrible Thunderlizards, Earl Devereaux in Cloudy with a Chance of Meatballs, himself in Mister T, the Alvin and the Chipmunks episode "The C Team", the House of Mouse episode "House Ghosts", the Johnny Bravo episode "T Is for Trouble", and The Simpsons episode "Today I Am a Clown").
 May 25: Ramon Pipin, French singer, songwriter and composer (Highlander: The Animated Series, Space Goofs, The New Adventures of Lucky Luke).
 May 28: 
 Denis Akiyama, Japanese-Canadian voice actor (voice of Iceman, Silver Samurai, and Sunfire in X-Men and Malachite in the original English dub of Sailor Moon), (d. 2018).
 Tad Stones, American animator (The Rescuers, The Fox and the Hound), storyboard artist (The Adventures of Brer Rabbit, Dante's Inferno: An Animated Epic, Neighbors from Hell, Scooby-Doo! Mystery Incorporated, Bob's Burgers, Allen Gregory, Ben 10: Destroy All Aliens), screenwriter (Sport Goofy in Soccermania, Disney Television Animation, Hellboy Animated, The Super Hero Squad Show, Generator Rex, The Adventures of Puss in Boots, Kulipari), producer (The Adventures of Brer Rabbit, Hellboy Animated, Secrets of the Furious Five) and director (Disney Television Animation, Hellboy Animated, Turok: Son of Stone, Kulipari).
 May 31: David Anthony Kraft, American comics writer, critic, publisher and animation screenwriter (G.I. Joe Extreme, Street Fighter), (d. 2021).

June
 June 4: Kerry Shale, Canadian actor (voice of Henry, Gordon, and Topham Hatt in Thomas & Friends, Larry Needlemeyer in The Amazing World of Gumball).
 June 6: Harvey Fierstein, American actor, playwright and screenwriter (voice of Yao in Mulan and Mulan II, Fat Cat Burglar in Foodfight!, Esmeralda in Animal Crackers, Karl in The Simpsons episode "Simpson and Delilah", Mrs. Leaperman in the Happily Ever After: Fairy Tales for Every Child episode "Thumbelina", Argus Panoptes in the Hercules episode "Hercules and the Bacchanal", Tracy in the Family Guy episode "The Former Life of Brian", himself in the BoJack Horseman, episode "Commence Fracking").
 June 7: Liam Neeson, Irish actor (voice of Aslan in The Chronicles of Narnia, Fujimoto in Ponyo, John Paul Jones in Liberty's Kids, Qui-Gon Jinn in Star Wars: The Clone Wars and Tales of the Jedi, Racoon in The Nut Job, Bad Cop/Good Cop in The Lego Movie, Father Sean in The Simpsons episode "The Father, the Son, and the Holy Guest Star", himself in the Family Guy episodes "Brian's a Bad Father" and "Fighting Irish").
 June 18:
 Miriam Flynn, American actress (voice of Jean Tasmanian Devil in Taz-Mania, Grandma Longneck in The Land Before Time franchise, Mildred Tabootie in ChalkZone, Gandra Dee in DuckTales, Lonely Sue in The Legend of Calamity Jane, Vera Tennyson in the Ben 10 episode "Permanent Retirement").
 Isabella Rossellini, Italian actress, author, philanthropist and model (voice of Ms. Canvenini in My Dog Tulip, Ambassador Henrietta Selick in Incredibles 2, Bat Queen in The Owl House, Astrid Weller in The Simpsons episode "Mom and Pop Art", Pat in the Tuca & Bertie episode "The Jelly Lakes").
 Carol Kane, American actress (voice of Brawnhilda in Aladdin, Maude in As Told by Ginger, Gilda in The Happy Elf, Sheep in Secrets of the Furious Five, Nana Shapiro in Phineas and Ferb, Sea Witch in Jake and the Never Land Pirates, Chompy in Animals, Madam Canardist in Rapunzel's Tangled Adventure, Madame Spook in Vampirina, Sue's Mother and Marilyn Chilson in F Is for Family, Ginger in OK K.O.! Let's Be Heroes, Ollie in the Tiny Toon Adventures episode "A Quack in the Quarks", Maggie Simpson in The Simpsons episode "Bart vs. Thanksgiving", Emily Dickinson Trophy in the Hey Arnold! episode "Phoebe Cheats", The Beetle in the Adventures from the Book of Virtues episode "Patience", Little Miss Muffet in the Blue's Clues episode "Blue's Big Treasure Hunt", Carol in the Family Guy episode "Emission Impossible", Mrs. Claus in The Grim Adventures of Billy & Mandy episode "Billy and Mandy Save Christmas", Grandma Troll in the Dora the Explorer episode "The Grumpy Old Troll Gets Married", Dr. Jelly Goodwell in the Star vs. the Forces of Evil episode  "Starfari", Barb Jr. in the Summer Camp Island episode "The Great Elf Invention Convention", The Sea Witch in the Bubble Guppies episode "The New Guppy!", Menopause Banshee and Old Woman in the Big Mouth episode "Florida").
 June 20: John Goodman, American actor (voice of Sulley in the Monsters, Inc. franchise, Pacha in The Emperor's New Groove and season 2 of The Emperor's New School, Frosty the Snowman in Frosty Returns, Baloo in The Jungle Book 2, Eli "Big Daddy" La Bouff in The Princess and the Frog, Larry in Father of the Pride, Robot Santa in the Futurama episode "Xmas Story").
 June 22: Barry Anthony Trop, American composer (Captain Zed and the Zee Zone, Big Bad Beetleborgs, SpongeBob SquarePants), (d. 2016).
 June 30: Patrick Pinney, American voice actor (voice of Mighty Mouse in Mighty Mouse: The New Adventures, Mainframe in G.I. Joe: A Real American Hero, Pa Gorg, Traveling Matt, and Flange Doozer in Fraggle Rock: The Animated Series, Wolverine in X-Men: Pryde of the X-Men, Cyclops in Hercules, Ben Grimm / Thing in Spider-Man, Painty the Pirate in SpongeBob SquarePants, additional voices in The Chipmunk Adventure, The Little Mermaid, DuckTales the Movie: Treasure of the Lost Lamp, Beauty and the Beast, An American Tail: Fievel Goes West, Aladdin, Toy Story, The Hunchback of Notre Dame, Mulan, Lilo & Stitch, and Treasure Planet).

July
 July 1:
 Brian George, English actor (voice of Duff Killigan in Kim Possible, Guru Pathik in Avatar: The Last Airbender, Professor Pyg in Beware the Batman, Appa Ali Apsa in Green Lantern: The Animated Series, Ki-Adi-Mundi in the Star Wars franchise, Mr. Frowny in the Steven Universe episode "Future Boy Zoltron", Jazzman in the Batman: The Animated Series episode "I Am the Knight").
 Dan Aykroyd, Canadian actor, comedian and musician (voice of Beldar in The Coneheads, Chip in Antz, the title character in Yogi Bear, Scarecrow in Legends of Oz: Dorothy's Return, Postage Stamp Fellow in The Simpsons episode "The Dad-Feelings Limited", himself in the Family Guy episode "Spies Reminiscent of Us").
 July 4: Ray Pointer, American animation historian, animator (Tom and Jerry: The Movie), sheet timer (Sonic the Hedgehog, CatDog, Oh Yeah! Cartoons) and director (Nickelodeon Animation Studio).
 July 8: Doug Molitor, American television writer (DIC Entertainment, Nelvana, Teenage Mutant Ninja Turtles, Beetlejuice, Captain Planet and the Planeteers, James Bond Jr., Free Willy, Happily Ever After: Fairy Tales for Every Child, Ripley's Believe It or Not!, Roswell Conspiracies: Aliens, Myths and Legends, Flight Squad, Sitting Ducks, Totally Spies!, X-Men: Evolution, Pet Alien, Pucca, The Penguins of Madagascar, Kid vs. Kat, Wild Grinders, Transformers: Rescue Bots).
 July 9: John Tesh, American pianist, composer (Bobby's World) and actor (voice of John Teshadactyl in Hollyrock-a-Bye Baby, himself in the Pinky and the Brain episode "A Pinky and the Brain Halloween").
 July 12: Stephen R. Johnson, American animator, painter, television director and music video director (Sledgehammer), (d. 2015).
 July 15: Marky Ramone, American drummer and member of the Ramones (voiced himself in The Simpsons episode "Rosebud" and the Uncle Grandpa episode "Late Night Good Morning with Uncle Grandpa").
 July 20: David Anderson, English animator (Dreamland Express), (d. 2015).

August
 August 12: Keith Dinicol, Canadian actor (voice of Willow 1 in Anne of Green Gables: The Animated Series), (d. 2021).
 August 18: Patrick Swayze, American actor, dancer and singer (voice of Cash in The Fox and the Hound 2), (d. 2009).
 August 19: Jonathan Frakes, American actor and director (voice of David Xanatos, Coyote and Alexander Fox in Gargoyles, William Riker in Star Trek: Lower Decks and the Family Guy episode "Peter's Got Woods", Grandpa Vincent in Miles from Tomorrowland, J'son in Guardians of the Galaxy, Steak Starbolt in Future-Worm!, King Faraday and Boss Moxie in Catwoman: Hunted, Peter in the Glenn Martin, DDS episode "GlennHog Day", High Evolutionary in The Super Hero Squad Show episode "The Devil Dinosaur You Say!", Adult Finn in the Adventure Time episodes "Puhoy" and "Dungeon Train", himself in the Futurama episode "Where No Fan Has Gone Before" and the Family Guy episode "Not All Dogs Go to Heaven").
 August 20: Dan Haskett, American animator (Raggedy Ann & Andy: A Musical Adventure, Animalympics, Easter Fever, Take Me Up to the Ball Game, The Fox and the Hound, Alvin and the Chipmunks, The Cabbage Patch Kids' First Christmas, The Chipmunk Adventure, Pinocchio and the Emperor of the Night, Daffy Duck's Quackbusters, Sesame Street, The New Adventures of Beany and Cecil, The Simpsons, Tom and Jerry: The Movie, The Swan Princess, The Pagemaster, The Sissy Duckling, Larryboy: The Cartoon Adventures, Space Jam: A New Legacy), storyboard artist (The Chipmunk Adventure, Police Academy, Garfield and Friends, The Smurfs, Bill & Ted's Excellent Adventures, Buster & Chauncey's Silent Night, Larryboy: The Cartoon Adventures, I Spy, Winnie the Pooh: Springtime with Roo, Johnny Bravo, Warner Bros. Animation, The Proud Family, Clifford's Puppy Days, Arthur's Missing Pal, Class of 3000, The Spectacular Spider-Man, The Fairly OddParents, Angelina Ballerina: The Next Steps), character designer (The Brave Little Toaster, Daffy Duck's Quackbusters, The Little Mermaid, The Simpsons, Beauty and the Beast, Warner Bros. Animation, FernGully: The Last Rainforest, Buster & Chauncey's Silent Night, Disneytoon Studios, The Prince of Egypt, The Sissy Duckling, The Nuttiest Nutcracker, Happily Ever After: Fairy Tales for Every Child, Globehunters: An Around the World in 80 Days Adventure, Johnny Bravo, The Land Before Time XI: Invasion of the Tinysauruses, Mosaic, Legends of Oz: Dorothy's Return, Madea's Tough Love) and art director (Johnny Bravo).
 August 21: Kumiko Takizawa, Japanese voice actress (voice of Grandis in Nadia: The Secret of Blue Water, Kate Hathaway and Lucina Pressette in Ginga Hyōryū Vifam, Shaya Thoov in The Super Dimension Century Orguss, Madoka Nagasaki in Miss Machiko, Panther Zora in New Cutie Honey, Naoko in Nabari no Ou, dub voice of Anabelle in All Dogs Go to Heaven), (d. 2022).
 August 24: Vaneese Thomas, American R&B, jazz and soul blues singer (voice of Clio in the Hercules franchise).
 August 26: Franco Zucca, Italian voice actor (dub voice of Mandarin in Iron Man, Manty in A Bug's Life, Fezziwig in Christmas Carol: The Movie, George Sanderson in Monsters, Inc., Monstar Bang in Space Jam, Jorgen Von Strangle in The Fairly OddParents, Zeke in Ice Age, Erik Hellstrom in Atlantis: The Lost Empire, Pachacamac in Sonic X, Lawrence in The Princess and the Frog, Furgus in Rango, Able in Tron: Uprising, Tom Jumbo-Grumbo in BoJack Horseman, Jerry Jumbeaux in Zootopia, Veterinarian in The Dragon Prince, Cat in Trollhunters: Tales of Arcadia, Joseph Roulin in Loving Vincent, Lord Piggot-Dunceby in Missing Link), (d. 2022).
 August 27: Paul Reubens, American actor and comedian (voice of Bat-Mite in Batman: The Brave and the Bold, Lock in The Nightmare Before Christmas, Fife in Beauty and the Beast: The Enchanted Christmas, Dennis in Teacher's Pet, Reuben in Chowder, Pavel in Tron: Uprising, Golly Gopher in Re-Animated).

September
 September 1: Phil Hendrie, American radio personality and voice actor (voice of various characters in King of the Hill, Free Waterfall Jr., Free Waterfall Sr., Old Man Waterfall, Frida Waterfall, Hutch Waterfall and the Encyclopod in Futurama, Doctor Jeff, Coach Pratt, Counselor Critchlow, Mr. Masthead, Art Doodle and Old Owl Judge in Napoleon Dynamite, Enchanted Forest Ranger and Flappy Jackson in The 7D, Principal Vagina and other various characters in Rick and Morty, Football Coach and Galvin in Squidbillies, Pyro Moth and Universe Simulator in The Midnight Gospel, Jim Jeffords, Reid Harrison and other various characters in F Is for Family, Mayor in The Replacements episode "Skate-Gate", Action Cops in the Unikitty! episode "License to Punch").
 September 5: Michael Horton, American actor (voice of Rick Jones, Beta Leader and Jonah in The Incredible Hulk, Chip Chase and Teenager at Discotheque in The Transformers, Jeff Wright, Craig Phillips, Mason Hawthorne and Alan in Jem, The Prince in Happily Ever After, Vytor in Vytor: The Starfire Champion, Boink in Zazoo U, Arn in The Legend of Prince Valiant, John Jameson in Spider-Man, Tommy Talltree in the G.I. Joe: A Real American Hero episode "Operation Mind Menace", additional voices in Lazer Tag Academy, The Karate Kid, Extreme Ghostbusters, The Brothers Flub). 
 September 10: Gerry Conway, American comic book and television writer (Hasbro, The Centurions, Dinosaucers, Batman: The Animated Series, Spider-Man).
 September 25: Christopher Reeve, American actor (voice of Clark Kent in a AT&T commercial, It Zwibble in the HBO Storybook Musicals episode "Earthday Birthday"), director (Everyone's Hero), and Activist, (d. 2004).
 September 27: Deanna Oliver, American television writer (Tiny Toon Adventures, Animaniacs, Casper) and actress (voice of Toaster in The Brave Little Toaster and its sequels, the title character in the Animaniacs episode "The Brave Little Trailer").
 September 28: George Scribner, American animator (Hanna-Barbera, Walt Disney Animation Studios).
 September 29: Gábor Csupó, Hungarian-American animator, writer, director, producer and graphic designer (co-founder of Klasky Csupo).

October
 October 16: Ron Taylor, American actor, singer and writer (voice of Bleeding Gums Murphy in The Simpsons, Mugsy and Bruno in Rover Dangerfield, Orderly in the Batman: The Animated Series episode "Dreams in Darkness", Ibalo in the Aaahh!!! Real Monsters episode "The Switching Hour"), (d. 2002).
 October 18: Chuck Lorre, American actor, composer, television producer and writer (DIC Entertainment, Marvel Productions, Toxic Crusaders).
 October 21: Matt Landers, American actor (voice of Frankie in Batman: The Animated Series, Captain Logan in Bill & Ted's Excellent Adventures, Louie in the Batman Beyond episode "Terry's Friend Dates A Robot", Turk in the Freakazoid! episode "Hot Rods from Heck!", Gang Leader in The New Batman Adventures episode "Growing Pains", Robber in the Superman: The Animated Series episode "Heavy Metal"), (d. 2015).
 October 22: Jeff Goldblum, American actor and musician (voice of Verminous Skumm in Captain Planet and the Planeteers, Aaron in The Prince of Egypt, Ajax in Zambezia, Dr. Armstrong in The Boss Baby: Family Business, Duke in Isle of Dogs, White Rabbit in Robbie the Reindeer in Legend of the Lost Tribe, Dr. Vayzosa in the King of the Hill episode "The Substitute Spanish Prisoner", Bill Joel in the Tom Goes to the Mayor episode "Toodle Day", Perry Van Moon in the Allen Gregory episode "Van Moon Rising", God in the Happy! episode "Resurrection", the Grandmaster in the What If... episode "What If... Thor Were an Only Child?", MacArthur Parker in The Simpsons episode "A Fish Called Selma", himself in the Dr. Katz, Professional Therapist episode "Sissy Boy").
 October 28: Annie Potts, American actress (voice of Bo Peep in the Toy Story franchise, Edmee in Arlo the Alligator Boy).

November
 November 2: Andy Paley, American songwriter (SpongeBob SquarePants, My Gym Partner's a Monkey, Handy Manny), record producer and composer (SpongeBob SquarePants, Camp Lazlo, Random! Cartoons, Mighty Magiswords).
 November 3:
 Jim Cummings, American voice actor (voice of the Tasmanian Devil in Taz-Mania, the title character and Negaduck in Darkwing Duck, Fat Cat, Monterey Jack, and Norton Nimul in Chip 'n Dale: Rescue Rangers, Ray in The Princess and the Frog, Lord Boxman in OK K.O.! Let's Be Heroes, Don Karnage and Louie in TaleSpin, Cat in CatDog, Dr. Robotnik in Sonic the Hedgehog, Fuzzy Lumpkins in The Powerpuff Girls, the title character in Bonkers, Hondo Ohnaka in Star Wars: The Clone Wars and Star Wars Rebels, Ed in The Lion King, Psy-Crow and Bob the Killer Goldfish in Earthworm Jim, continued voice of Winnie the Pooh, Tigger, and Pete).
 Roseanne Barr, American actress, comedian, writer and producer (voice of Maggie in Home on the Range, Kraang Prime in Teenage Mutant Ninja Turtles, herself in the Futurama episode "Three Hundred Big Boys").
 November 5: Laslo Nosek, Hungarian animator, storyboard artist (The Adventures of the Galaxy Rangers), character designer, art director, production designer, writer and producer (Klasky Csupo, co-creator of The Brothers Flub).
 November 8: Alfre Woodard, American actress (voice of Plio in Dinosaur, Maisie in The Brave Little Toaster to the Rescue, Akela in The Wild Thornberrys Movie, Mimi in Moon Girl and Devil Dinosaur, Wilnoome in the Happily Ever After: Fairy Tales for Every Child episode "Goldilocks and the Three Bears", Jean Hawkins in the Static Shock episode "Flashback").
 November 14: 
 Bill Farmer, American voice actor, comedian and impressionist (voice of Foghorn Leghorn, Sylvester and Yosemite Sam in Space Jam, the President in Totally Spies, Stinkie in Casper: A Spirited Beginning and Casper Meets Wendy, Doc in The 7D, Hop Pop in Amphibia, continued voice of Goofy, Pluto and Horace Horsecollar).
 Maggie Roswell, American actress, comedian, writer and producer (voice of Teegra in Fire and Ice, Pearl Pureheart in Mighty Mouse: The New Adventures, Little Girl in Yogi and the Invasion of the Space Bears, Barbara Simone in A Pup Named Scooby-Doo, Maude Flanders, Helen Lovejoy, Luann Van Houten, Miss Hoover, and other various characters in The Simpsons, News Reporter and Superheroine in Darkwing Duck, Anita the Hairdresser in the Bonkers episode "Weather or Not", Caitlyn in the Teenage Mutant Ninja Turtles episode "The Great Boldini", Mary Vain in the Tiny Toon Adventures episode "Hollywood Plucky").
 November 15: Randy Savage, American professional wrestler and actor (voice of Thug in Bolt, Sasquatch in The X's, Rasslor in the Dexter's Laboratory episode of the same name, Leonard Ghostal in the Space Ghost Coast to Coast episode "Piledriver", Master Sergeant Emily Dickinson Jones in the Duck Dodgers episode "Back to the Academy", Biker in the Whatever Happened to Robot Jones? episode "Family Vacation", Gorilla in the King of the Hill episode "Bill, Bulk and the Body Buddies"), (d. 2011).
 November 16:
 Shigeru Miyamoto, Japanese video game designer, game director and producer (The Super Mario Bros. Movie).
 Peter Keefe, American television producer (Voltron, Denver the Last Dinosaur, Widget) and co-founder of Zodiac Entertainment, (d. 2010).
 November 20: Steven Wilzbach, American animator (Warner Bros. Feature Animation), camera operator (DePatie-Freleng Enterprises, Filmation, Hanna-Barbera, The Prince and the Pauper, Rover Dangerfield, FernGully: The Last Rainforest, Tom and Jerry: The Movie, The Swan Princess), cinematographer (The Iron Giant) and producer (Eight Crazy Nights, The SpongeBob SquarePants Movie, Tutenstein), (d. 2022).
 November 30:
 Mandy Patinkin, American actor and singer (voice of Louie in Castle in the Sky, Stanley Irving in Everyone's Hero, Basil in Jock the Hero Dog, Hattori in The Wind Rises, Papa Smurf in Smurfs: The Lost Village, Hugh Parkfield in The Simpsons episode "Lisa's Wedding", Hippocrates in the Hercules episode "Hercules and the World's First Doctor", The Groundhog in the Wonder Pets! episode "Help the Groundhog!", Mr. Lambert in the Nina's World episode "Nina's Library Hop").
 Henry Selick, American film director, producer, and writer (The Nightmare Before Christmas, James and the Giant Peach, Coraline, Wendell & Wild).
 Keith Giffen, American comic book artist (DC Comics, Marvel Comics), television writer (The Real Ghostbusters, Ed, Edd n Eddy, Hi Hi Puffy AmiYumi) and storyboard artist (Spider-Man Unlimited, Batman Beyond, Static Shock).

December
 December 2: Keith Szarabajka, American actor (voice of Kip O'Donnell in The Wild Thornberrys, Cikatro Vizago in Star Wars Rebels, Lieutenant Rockford in the Roughnecks: Starship Troopers Chronicles episode "D-Day", Living Laser in the Ultimate Spider-Man episode "Flight of the Iron Spider", Ronan the Accuser in The Avengers: Earth's Mightiest Heroes episode "Welcome to the Kree Empire").
 December 9: Michael Dorn, American voice actor (voice of the title character in I Am Weasel, Coldstone in Gargoyles, Kalibak in the DC Animated Universe, Steel in Superman: The Animated Series, the Martian Centurion Robots in Duck Dodgers, Rufus 3000 in Kim Possible: A Sitch in Time, Worf, and himself in Family Guy, Battle Beast in Invincible, Atrocitus in Justice League Action, Dr. Viktor and Frankenstrike in Ben 10, Ronan the Accuser in The Super Hero Squad Show).
 December 12: Sarah Douglas, English actress (voice of Alana Ulanova in the Iron Man episode "Enemy Within, Enemy Without", Una in the Gargoyles episode "M.I.A.", Mrs. Cadbury in The Real Adventures of Jonny Quest episode "Village of the Doomed", Mala in the Superman: The Animated Series episode "Absolute Power").
 December 19:
 Linda Woolverton, American screenwriter (Walt Disney Animation Studios).
 Walter Murphy, American composer (Channel Umptee-3, Family Guy, Fillmore!, American Dad!, Seth MacFarlane's Cavalcade of Cartoon Comedy, The Cleveland Show, Foodfight!, How Murray Saved Christmas), keyboardist, songwriter, music producer and orchestrator (Teacher's Pet, Mickey's Twice Upon a Christmas).
 December 25: CCH Pounder, Guyanese-American actress (voice of Amanda Waller in Justice League Unlimited, Superman/Batman: Public Enemies, and Batman: Assault on Arkham, Officer Shirley in season 1 of Rocket Power, Coldfire in Gargoyles, Marion Grange in Beware the Batman, Kongwe in The Lion Guard episode "The Wisdom of Kongwe").
 December 29: Efron Etkin, Israeli actor (dub voice of Piglet in Winnie the Pooh and Dolf in Alfred J. Kwak), (d. 2012).

Specific date unknown
 John P. McCann, American television producer and writer (Warner Bros. Animation, The Adventures of Jimmy Neutron, Boy Genius, Dave the Barbarian, Catscratch, Biker Mice from Mars, Animalia, Pink Panther and Pals, Kung Fu Panda: Legends of Awesomeness, The 7D, The Mr. Peabody & Sherman Show), and voice actor (voice of Douglas Douglas and Hero Boy in Freakazoid!).
 Ronald A. Weinberg, American-born Canadian former television producer and businessman (co-founder of CINAR).
 Bill St. James, American announcer and radio personality (voice of Announcer in The Angry Beavers episode "Dagski and Norb", Grandpa Panda in the Go, Diego, Go! episode "All Aboard the Giant Panda Express!", announcer for Nickelodeon and Adult Swim).
 Christopher Hinton, Canadian film animator, film director and professor (National Film Board of Canada, Blowhard, Blackfly, Nibbles and cNote)

Deaths

March
 March 1: Gregory La Cava, American animator and film director (Raoul Barré, International Film Service), dies at age 59.
 March 25: Egon von Tresckow, German animator, illustrator, comics artist and caricaturist (worked for UFA and the films of Hans Fischerkoesen), dies at age 45.

June
 June 25: Fred Brunish, American painter and animator (Walter Lantz), dies at age 49 or 50.

November
 November 23: Fred Moore, American animator (Walt Disney Company), dies at age 41.

See also
List of anime by release date (1946–1959)

References

External links 
Animated works of the year, listed in the IMDb